Pedro Barros (born March 15, 1995), known as Pedrinho Barros, is a Brazilian skateboarder who is specialized in Bowl and Park Skateboarding. He won the silver medal in the inaugural Olympic men's park skateboarding event at the 2020 Summer Olympics in Tokyo. Also, in doom metal/dark punk band Melissa, Pedro is an entrepreneur, having his own beer company (LayBack) and his fashion and lifestyle brand, Privê (Privet, in Portuguese).

Career
His skateboarding career started in 2008. In 2008, Barros won the X Games Skateboarding Vert amateur event; in 2009, he ended up in third place in the same event. These two appearances were Pedro's kick-start into a successful X Games career. Furthermore, he got second at the Red-Bull-Crossover in 2009 where he defeated his big idol Sandro Dias for the first time.

In 2010, Barros won X Games gold in Park as a rookie after a battle against Andy Macdonald. Pedro was the first rookie to win skateboard gold since Ryan Sheckler won gold in Park in 2003. He also participated in the X Games Big Air competition the same year and ended up in fourth place. Additionally he won the overall Bowl title of World Cup Skateboarding.

In 2011, Barros landed in second place in the X Games Park event and 14th place in the X Games Vert competition. Again he won the overall Bowl title of World Cup Skateboarding. In 2012, he again won gold in the X Games Park event and won the Vans BOWL-A-RAMA in New York. For the third time in a row he won the overall Bowl title of World Cup Skateboarding.

In 2013, he won two X Games gold medals in Park, one at the X Games in Foz do Iguaçu and the other at the X Games in Barcelona. At the X Games in Munich in 2013, he won the silver medal in Park. For four straight years, he won the overall Bowl title of World Cup Skateboarding.  Pedro's winning series continued in 2014, where he got his fifth gold medal in an X Games Park event in Austin, Los Angeles. In the same year he won the Volcom BOWL-A-RAMA in Getxo, Spain and the BOWL-A-RAMA in Wellington, New Zealand. He landed in third in the Bowl ranking of World Cup Skateboarding. In 2015, he won silver at the X Games Park event in Austin. Again he landed in third place in the Bowl ranking of World Cup Skateboarding.

In 2016, he won the X Games Park competition and won his sixth X Games gold medal in total. Until then, he has never finished worse than silver in an astounding Skateboard Park run that began with rookie gold in 2010. In the same year, he also won the Vans Pool Party in California. He won the Vans Park Series in Florianopolis and had two second places at the tour stops in Melbourne and Malmö, which were also the 2016 World Championships in Park Skateboarding.

In 2017, Barros won the Vans Park Series in Vancouver and São Paulo, got third place in Sydney and second place at the tour stop in Malmö, Sweden.

In 2018, his sponsor, Drop Dead Skateboards, released a movie called "Silver Era", featuring a video part by Baros. The same year, he was fourth at Minneapolis's X Games Park event. He won the Vans Park Series event in Vancouver and got three second places at the tour stops in Suzhou, São Paulo and Huntington Beach. He also won the Red Bull Bowl Rippers in Marseilles. In the same year Pedro executed a movie project with Red Bull called "Pedro's Bigger Picture", where he skates artistically designed art features that showcase his favorite skate spots around the world."

Until now, Pedro Barros had nine X Games appearances, taking six gold and three silver medals. He trails only Dave Mirra in first or second-place finishes to start an X Games career in a single discipline (Mirra had ten straight in BMX Vert).

Business
In recent years, Pedro has been working in different areas other than sports, having his own artisan beer company, LayBack, and his fashion brand Privê, which debuted on his 27th birthday.

References

External links 
 Pedro Barros athlete profile at vans.com
 Verified profile at Instagram
 Verified profile at Facebook
 Pedro Barros "Silver Era" moviepart
 2018 VPS Rider Interview: Pedro Barros

1995 births
Living people
Brazilian skateboarders
Medalists at the 2020 Summer Olympics
Olympic medalists in skateboarding
Olympic silver medalists for Brazil
Olympic skateboarders of Brazil
Skateboarders at the 2020 Summer Olympics
Sportspeople from Florianópolis
X Games athletes
World Skateboarding Championship medalists